Dume language may refer to:
a variety of the Tsamai language of Ethiopia
a dialect of the Vame language of Cameroon